Foundations and Trends in Communications and Information Theory is a peer-reviewed academic journal that publishes long survey and tutorial articles in the field of communication and information theory. It was established in 2004 and is published by Now Publishers. The founding editor-in-chief was Sergio Verdú (Princeton University) and the current editor-in-chief is Alexander Barg (University of Maryland). Each issue comprises a single 50–150 page monograph.

Abstracting and indexing 
The journal is abstracted and indexed in:
 Inspec
 EI-Compendex
 Scopus
 CSA databases
 ACM Digital Library

External links
 

Computer science journals
Now Publishers academic journals
Publications established in 2004
Quarterly journals
English-language journals